Abishevo (Äbeş) is a rural locality (a village) in Bikkulovsky Selsoviet of Miyakinsky District, Bashkortostan, Russia. The population was 78 as of 2010. There are 3 streets.

Geography 
Abishevo is located 34 km north of Kirgiz-Miyaki (the district's administrative centre) by road. Kul-Kunkas is the nearest rural locality.

Ethnicity 
The village is inhabited by Bashkirs and others.

References 

Rural localities in Miyakinsky District